Sunamganj Science and Technology University (SSTU) is a newly established public university in Bangladesh. It was established in 2020 and located in Sunamganj district.

List of vice-chancellors 

 Dr. Md. Abu Naim Sheikh (2022)

References

Educational institutions established in 2020
Sunamganj District
Universities and colleges in Bangladesh
2020 establishments in Bangladesh